The women's 800 metres event at the 2003 Asian Athletics Championships was held in Manila, Philippines on September 22–23.

Medalists

Results

Heats

Final

References

2003 Asian Athletics Championships
800 metres at the Asian Athletics Championships
2003 in women's athletics